Baltimore is an unincorporated community in Cocke County, Tennessee, in the United States. It took its name after Baltimore, Maryland.

References

Unincorporated communities in Cocke County, Tennessee
Unincorporated communities in Tennessee